Obanliku (Banliku, Abanliku) is a Bendi language of Nigeria. There are five dialects or varieties: Bisu, Busi, Bishiri, Basang and Bebi.

In a 2011 survey, it was found that the Bisu, Busi, Bishiri and Bebi dialects share above 75% lexical similarity and are mutually intelligible, but the southwestern Basang dialect had less than 75%, causing some difficulty for speakers of the other dialects. Basang speakers could understand the other dialects, however. Additionally, all Obanliku speakers have some understanding of the neighbouring Bete-Bendi language, mainly through learning it at the market; the Obanliku and Bete-Bendi languages also had an average of 70% lexical similarity.

References

Bendi languages
Languages of Nigeria